Anathece is a genus of cyanobacteria belonging to the family Synechococcaceae.

The genus was first described by Komárek and Anagnostidis in 2011 as Aphanothece subgenus Anathece.

The genus has cosmopolitan distribution.

Species:
 Anathece bachmannii
 Anathece clathrata
 Anathece minutissima
 Anathece smithii

References

Synechococcales
Cyanobacteria genera